J. Martin McNabb (died April 2, 1926) was an American politician from Maryland. He served in the Maryland House of Delegates, representing Harford County, from 1884 to 1888.

Career
J. Martin McNabb was a director of Harford Bank. He worked as a teacher in Maryland schools in the 1870s. McNabb was admitted to the bar and ran a law practice until 1925.

McNabb was a Democrat. McNabb ran for county surveyor in 1873. He was elected as a member of the Maryland House of Delegates, representing Harford County, from 1884 to 1888.

Personal life
McNabb married Sarah Ellen Savin. They had one son, Charles H. McNabb. His wife died in 1924.

McNabb died on April 2, 1926, at the age of 79, at his home in Cardiff, Maryland. He was buried at Darlington Cemetery.

References

Year of birth missing
1840s births
1926 deaths
People from Cardiff, Maryland
Democratic Party members of the Maryland House of Delegates
Maryland lawyers
Schoolteachers from Maryland